Kalkowshavand-e Olya (also Romanized as Kalkowshavand-e ‘Olyā; also known as Kalkoshavand-e ‘Olyā and Kalkowshavand-e Bālā) is a village in Howmeh Rural District, in the Central District of Harsin County, Kermanshah Province, Iran. At the 2006 census, its population was 229, in 45 families.

References 

Populated places in Harsin County